Pervagor spilosoma is a species of filefish from reefs in the Hawaiian Islands. It occasionally makes its way into the aquarium trade. It grows to a size of 18 cm in length.

References
 

Monacanthidae
Fish of Hawaii
Fish described in 1839